Little England is a British documentary show that aired on ITV from 12 September 2011 to 17 December 2012 and was narrated by Geoffrey Palmer.

Transmissions

External links
 

2010s British documentary television series
2011 British television series debuts
2012 British television series endings
ITV documentaries
Television series by ITV Studios
English-language television shows
Television shows set in France